The 2001 UAW-DaimlerChrysler 400 was the third stock car race of the 2001 NASCAR Winston Cup Series and the fourth iteration of the event. The race was held on Sunday, March 4, 2001, in North Las Vegas, Nevada at Las Vegas Motor Speedway, a  permanent D-shaped oval racetrack. The race took the scheduled 267 laps to complete. At race's end, Jeff Gordon, driving for Hendrick Motorsports, would make a late-race comeback from the back to win his 53rd career NASCAR Winston Cup Series win and his first of the season. To fill out the podium, Dale Jarrett of Robert Yates Racing and Sterling Marlin of Chip Ganassi Racing with Felix Sabates would finish second and third, respectively.

Background 

Las Vegas Motor Speedway, located in Clark County, Nevada outside the Las Vegas city limits and about 15 miles northeast of the Las Vegas Strip, is a 1,200-acre (490 ha) complex of multiple tracks for motorsports racing. The complex is owned by Speedway Motorsports, Inc., which is headquartered in Charlotte, North Carolina.

Entry list

Practice

First practice 
The first practice session was held on Friday, March 2, at 1:20 PM PST, and would last for one hour and 40 minutes.

Second and final practice 
The second and final practice session, sometimes referred to as Happy Hour, was held on Saturday, March 3, at 1:45 PM PST, and would last for one hour and 30 minutes.

Qualifying 
Qualifying was held on Friday, March 2, at 2:15 PM EST. Each driver would have two laps to set a fastest time; the fastest of the two would count as their official qualifying lap. Positions 1-36 would be decided on time, while positions 37-43 would be based on provisionals. Six spots are awarded by the use of provisionals based on owner's points. The seventh is awarded to a past champion who has not otherwise qualified for the race. If no past champ needs the provisional, the next team in the owner points will be awarded a provisional.

Four drivers would fail to qualify: Kyle Petty, Brendan Gaughan, Andy Houston, and Rick Mast.

Full qualifying results

Race results

References 

2001 NASCAR Winston Cup Series
NASCAR races at Las Vegas Motor Speedway
March 2001 sports events in the United States
2001 in sports in Nevada